Scott Bemand (born 21 September 1978 in Hereford) is a retired English rugby union player. He formerly played for Harlequins, Leicester Tigers and Bath.

He was a member of the senior England squad that toured Australia in 2006.

Bemand played for three seasons at  Leicester Tigers before injury forced him out of the team at the end of the 2006–7 season.
After a year blighted by injury, he signed to play for Bath Rugby from the 2008/9 season.

Further injury forced his retirement at the end of the 2009–10 season.

Bemand is currently a coach at Dorchester RFC coaching all 3 teams within the senior squad on a weekly basis. On 21 May 2015 he was announced as the new England Women's team lead coach

References

External links
Leicester Tigers profile
 NEC Harlequins profile

English rugby union players
1978 births
Living people
Leicester Tigers players
Alumni of Harper Adams University
Rugby union players from Hereford
Rugby union scrum-halves